Walnut Beach is a town beach and surrounding neighborhood located in Milford, Connecticut and was formerly the site of an amusement park. A boardwalk along the shoreline connects to the beach at Silver Sands State Park to the east and Charles Island.

History
In 1923, an amusement park was built here by the Whitham brothers. A dance hall and a boxing arena drew thousands in the summer. In 1938, a hurricane destroyed many of the rides.  The park continued into the 1940's and was then revitalized in the 1950's when the park was refurbished by Frank and Les Smith. Subsequent redevelopment brought an end to the park.

Climate 
In the summer months, Walnut Beach can reach highs into the upper 90°F. Walnut Beach has a record high temperature of 103°F in the month of July. The coldest day on record was -7°F in the month of January.

References

Long Island Sound
Parks in New Haven County, Connecticut
Beaches of Connecticut
Landforms of New Haven County, Connecticut
1923 establishments in Connecticut